The 1948 NCAA baseball tournament was the second NCAA-sanctioned baseball tournament that determined a national champion.    The tournament was held as the conclusion of the 1948 NCAA baseball season.  The  College World Series was played at Hyames Field on the campus of Western Michigan University in Kalamazoo, Michigan from June 25 to 26.  The tournament champion was Southern California coached by Sam Barry and Rod Dedeaux.  It was the Trojans' first of 12 championships through the 2022 season.

Tournament
The tournament was divided into two regional brackets, the Eastern playoff and the Western playoff.  Unlike the previous year, this year's tournament was double-elimination.

Field
As with the inaugural tournament, each representative of the eight districts was determined by a mix of selection committees, conference champions, and district playoffs..  Eight teams were divided among the East and West brackets.  The district playoffs would later expand to become regionals, but were originally not part of the NCAA-sanctioned championship play.

Eastern playoff
At Winston-Salem, North Carolina

Western playoff
At Denver, Colorado

College World Series

Participants

Results
The 1948 College World Series was a best of three series, like the first tournament in 1947.

Bracket

Game results

Notable players
 Southern California: Jim Brideweser, Gail Henley, Wally Hood, Hank Workman, Henry Cedillos 
 Yale: George Bush, Frank Quinn, Dick Tettelbach

Notes

References

Tournament
NCAA Division I Baseball Championship
NCAA baseball tournament
NCAA baseball tournament
NCAA baseball tournament
NCAA baseball tournament
NCAA baseball tournament 1948
Baseball competitions in North Carolina
Baseball competitions in Colorado
Baseball competitions in Michigan
Baseball competitions in Denver
Sports competitions in Kalamazoo, Michigan
Sports competitions in Winston-Salem, North Carolina